Montenegro competed at the 2017 World Aquatics Championships in Budapest, Hungary from 14 July to 30 July.

Swimming

Montenegro has received a Universality invitation from FINA to send three swimmers (two men and one woman) to the World Championships.

Water polo

Montenegro qualified a men's team.

Men's tournament

Team roster

Dejan Lazović
Draško Brguljan
Bojan Banicević
Marko Petković
Darko Brguljan
Aleksandar Radović
Dragan Drašković
Aleksa Ukropina
Đuro Radović
Saša Mišić
Uroš Čučković
Nikola Murisić
Miloš Šćepanović (C)

Group play

Quarterfinals

5th–8th place semifinals

Fifth place game

References

Nations at the 2017 World Aquatics Championships
Montenegro at the World Aquatics Championships
2017 in Montenegrin sport